is a railway line operated by Kintetsu Railway connecting  in Osaka and  in Kashihara, Nara Prefecture via Osaka's southern suburb cities of Matsubara, Fujiidera and Habikino in Osaka Prefecture, and Katsuragi and Yamato-Takada in Nara Prefecture. The line is the major access from Osaka to southern part of Nara Basin, and together with the Yoshino Line is the main access to the Yoshino refuge of Emperor Godaigo, a popular tourism destination, especially during spring.

History
The next year  took over the line, then the company renamed itself . The railway constructed its own access line to Osaka center, completed in 1923 and electrified at 1,500 V DC, then the highest voltage in Japan. The entire route was competing with the present Osaka Line, but Osaka Railway was merged to the then , predecessor of Kintetsu, in 1943.

Operations
Some trains go through to the Nagano Line or the Yoshino Line, some operate between Furuichi and Gose Station on the Gose Line, and some from Gose run through to Osaka Abenobashi. Local trains run between Osaka Abenobashi and Fujiidera or Furuichi, and between Furuichi and Kashiharajingū-mae (including conductorless trains between Furuichi and Kashiharajingū-mae).

Rapid service
Local train (普通 Futsu)

Running all day, but the operation is divided at Furuichi station except in the early morning and late night. 

Osaka-Abenobashi-Furuichi
Osaka Abenobashi - Fujiidera or Furuichi is the basic operating pattern, with four trains per hour between Osaka-Abenobashi and Fujiidera during the day, along with two additional trains between Osaka Abenobashi and Furuichi. A few trains run from Kawachi-Amami to Osaka Abenobashi in the early morning and back to Kawachi-Amami station late at night. Local trains are overtaken by Semi express trains at Imagawa, and by Limited Express or express trains at Kawachi Amami.

Furuichi-Kashiharajingu-Mae or Yoshino
Normal operation is between Furuichi and Kashihara Jingu-mae. Some trains continue to Yoshino on the Yoshino Line in early morning and late nights.

In this section semi-express trains make all stops, but few trains operate here as most run on the Nagano Line after Furuichi. Local and semi-express trains to Osaka Abenobashi twice per hour alternate to provide constant daytime service. There is a direct connection from the Gose Line at Shakudo, and some trains run between Shakudo and Kashihara Jingu-mae only on weekday mornings.

 (SmE)

Semi-express trains operate between Osaka Abenobashi - Kashihara Jingu-mae or Kawachinagano. Two trains per hour run to Kashihara Jingu-mae and four to Kawachinagano. During morning rush hours, some trains operate from Gose to Osaka Abenobashi. A few trains also continue from Kashihara Jingu-mae to Yoshino as well.

 (SbE)

One train on weekday mornings from Kashihara Jingu-Mae to Osaka Abenobashi and two trains on weekday evenings and one on weekend evenings in the reverse direction.

 (Ex)

Two trains per hour from Osaka Abenobashi, through to Yoshino on the Yoshino line. Unlike other trains on this line, they are not overtaken by limited express trains at intermediate stations.

Rapid express trains are operated in spring, and the stops on the Minami Osaka Line are the same as for express trains. It waits for up to 12 minutes at Kashihara Jingu-mae Station where it is overtaken by limited express trains, taking longer than normal express trains.

 (LE)

Limited express trains operate between Osaka Abenobashi and Kashihara Jingu-mae or Yoshino, one to two trains per hour on weekdays and two per hour on weekends. Some trains are operated by dedicated Sakura Liner rolling stock. To board limited express trains, a limited express ticket is needed in addition to a regular ticket.

Limited Express Blue Symphony (特急　青のシンフォニー）（LE）

Operates twice a day except Wednesdays (a normal limited express train operates instead, but without the dedicated name or train set). Stations are the same as regular limited express trains. Limited Express. To board the Limited Express Blue Symphony, a limited express ticket and special car ticket are needed in addition to a regular ticket.

Stations
〇: All trains stop.
△: Some limited express trains stop at Furuichi (Osaka-bound trains until 9:34 a.m. or 9:35 a.m., and Kashihara-bound and Yoshino-bound trains departing Osaka Abenobashi after 8 p.m.).
Local trains (普通) stop at every station.
For distances and connections, see route diagram.

References

This article incorporates material from the corresponding article in the Japanese Wikipedia

External links
Tourist Guide of Kintetsu
 Line map

Lines of Kintetsu Railway
Rail transport in Osaka Prefecture
Rail transport in Nara Prefecture
1067 mm gauge railways in Japan
Railway lines opened in 1898
1898 establishments in Japan